The 1992 Appalachian State Mountaineers football team was an American football team that represented Appalachian State University as a member of the Southern Conference (SoCon) during the 1992 NCAA Division I-AA football season. In their fourth year under head coach Jerry Moore, the Mountaineers compiled an overall record of 7–5 with a conference mark of 5–2. Appalachian State advanced to the NCAA Division I-AA Football Championship playoffs, where they lost to Middle Tennessee in the first round.

Schedule

References

Appalachian State
Appalachian State Mountaineers football seasons
Appalachian State Mountaineers football